Beara is a rural municipality in Ampanihy Ouest (district) in Atsimo-Andrefana, Madagascar.

Rivers
It is on the Linta River that flooded the village in 1968, 1981 and 2005.

References

Populated places in Atsimo-Andrefana